Tom Vaughan may refer to:

Tom Vaughan (actor) (born 1985), English actor
Tom Vaughan (director) (born 1969), Scottish television and film director
 Tom Vaughan (producer) (born 1969), American TV producer

See also
Thomas Vaughan (disambiguation)
Tom Vaughn (disambiguation)